"Kissing the Sun" is a single by The Young Gods appearing on their 1995 album Only Heaven.

Music video for the track was directed by Eric Zimmerman, who is known for his work on Nine Inch Nails's "Head Like a Hole" and Soundgarden's "Jesus Christ Pose."

Track listing
 "Kissing The Sun (Radio Edit)" - 3:40
 "Lointaine (Instrumental)" - 4:20
 "Kissing The Sun (Babylon By The Bay Mix)" - 6:08

Accolades
The information regarding accolades acquired from AcclaimedMusic.net

Footnotes

The Young Gods songs
1995 singles
1995 songs
PIAS Recordings singles